Dagmar Rothman (1920 – 1952) born as Dagobert Roehmann was a German professional regurgitator known by his stage name The Great Waldo. He was known to be able to swallow many animals including fish, frogs, mice and rats and was able to regurgitate them on will.

Career
Rothman was born in 1920 to a Jewish family living in Germany. He grew up in the 1920s and had been fond of the circus, but was considered "too unremarkable" to join. Rothman began practicing how to swallow and regurgitate objects including light bulbs, razor blades, lemons and pocket watches before moving on to live animals. In 1938, he fled to Switzerland after Adolf Hitler invaded Austria. There, he was discovered by an American sideshow talent agent and emigrated to the United States.

He performed with Ripley's Believe It or Not! where he would swallow inanimate objects and then fish, frogs, mice and later rats. He was able to swallow a series of colored balls and regurgitate them in any specific order. Rothman was impeccably dressed and was often seen in a tuxedo. He has been described as "elegant and gentle".

Death
Rothman committed suicide by gassing himself in 1952, reportedly over a woman.

See also
 Performance artist
 Professional regurgitation

References

1920 births
1952 suicides
German performance artists
German people of Jewish descent
Suicides by gas
German emigrants to the United States
1952 deaths
Suicides in the United States
Jewish emigrants from Austria after the Anschluss
Jewish emigrants from Nazi Germany to Switzerland